Ian Hicks may refer to: 

Birth name of Baron Mordant, see Skull Disco
Birth name of Hixxy, happy hardcore musician
Ian Hicks, electronic musician (fl. 1980–1987) in Portion Control (band)